Karet Station (KAT) is a railway station located in Kebon Melati, Tanah Abang, Central Jakarta. This station lies on the north bank of West Flood Canal. This station only serves Commuterline trains. This station and Sudirman station are spaced only 0.8 km between each other, making it one of the shortest stretch between any two stations in the network. It only takes one minute to travel between these two stations. BNI City railway station, a station that serves Soekarno–Hatta Airport Rail Link exclusively, is wedged between these two station.

Regarding the discourse on closing this station as a result of the operation of the Sudirman Baru Station (BNI City), KAI Commuter has denied this discourse. Anne Purba as the VP Corporate Secretary KAI Commuter said that Karet Station is not closed and would still be used to serve KRL users. Related to this, KAI Commuter operates the station to divide traffic density by up to 40%

Services
The following is a list of train services at the Karet Station.

Passenger services 
 KAI Commuter
  Cikarang Loop Line (Full Racket)
  Cikarang Loop Line (Half Racket), to / (via  and ) and

Places of Interest
Karet Bivak Cemetery
The London School of Public Relations
LaSalle College Jakarta 
 Wisma 46 BNI
Shangri-La Hotel Jakarta
Popular Theater Teguh Karya Building

References

Central Jakarta
Railway stations in Jakarta